Historic Churches Scotland (formerly the Scottish Redundant Churches Trust) is a registered charity founded in 1996 which looks after Scottish churches which are of outstanding historic or architectural significance but are no longer used for regular worship. The Trust receives funding from Historic Scotland and public donations. Funding for restoration of churches in Trust ownership is received from the Heritage Lottery Fund, Historic Scotland, the Listed Places of Worship Grant Scheme, the Scottish Churches Architectural Heritage Trust, and other trusts and public donations.

The Trust conserves and repairs all of the churches in its care and runs a range of projects to encourage greater public enjoyment and understanding of historic churches.  Many of its buildings are used for community, arts and educational activities.  All remain as places of worship and occasional services are held.

The Trust presently maintains seven properties throughout Scotland: St Peter's Church, Sandwick in Orkney (acquired 1998), Cromarty East Church in Ross-shire (acquired 1998), Pettinain Church in Lanarkshire (acquired 2000), Tibbermore Church in Perthshire (acquired 2001), Benholm Kirk, Kincardineshire (acquired 2006), Kildrummy Kirk (acquired 2009), and St Margaret's Church, Braemar (acquired 2013). The Trust changed its name to Historic Churches Scotland in January 2019.

Key

List of properties

Notes
This is the date of first construction of the existing building.

References

External links
Historic Churches Scotland website 
Cromarty East Church website

Architecture in Scotland
Organizations established in 1996
Charities based in Scotland
Heritage organisations in Scotland
Heritage conservation in Scotland
 
1996 establishments in Scotland
Architectural conservation
Interested parties in planning in Scotland
Organisations based in Fife
St Andrews